may refer to:

 the opening words in German of Psalm 100 ('O be joyful in the Lord, all ye lands')
 Jauchzet dem Herren, alle Welt, SWV 36, a setting of Psalm 100 in German for double choir by Heinrich Schütz, published in 1619
 Jauchzet dem Herrn alle Welt (motet), a pasticcio with parts by Telemann and Bach
 Jauchzet dem Herrn, alle Welt (Mendelssohn), an anthem for eight voices
 Jauchzet dem Herren, alle Welt (Reger), the beginning of the choral symphony Der 100. Psalm